Ram Niwas Goel is an Indian politician serving as Speaker of the Delhi legislative assembly since 2015. He serves as a Member of Delhi Legislative Assembly for Shahdara.

Early life and education
Ram Niwas Goel was born in Safidon Mandi, Haryana on 5 January 1948 to a business family. Goel is the eldest of eight siblings (five brothers and three sisters). In 1964, their family moved to Delhi. He completed his secondary and senior secondary education in Haryana and Delhi and subsequently he attended Hansraj College to attain B.Com. degree. He has been actively involved in social work especially in the field of Education & Health for the weaker sections. He has been associated with numerous social organizations active in providing medical services, health services, promotion of religious harmony and servicing kanwad yaatris.

Some of prominent positions held by him from time to time are:
Founder Member, Maharaja Agrasen Sewa Sansthan, Pathological Lab, X-Ray, Ultrasound, E.C.G. etc. on not-for-profit basis.
Chief Organiser, Delhi-UP Border Shiv Kanwad Samiti which is the most popular camp for Kanwad Yatris in Delhi.
Chief Advisor of Maharaja Agrasen Sewa Sangh which provides ambulance service and hearse service to general public on not-for-profit basis.

Political career
Ram Niwas Goel was elected as Speaker of Delhi Legislative Assembly on 23 February 2015. His term as MLA in the Sixth Legislative Assembly of Delhi is his second term and is a member of the Aam Aadmi Party.. He defeated Jitender Singh Shunty of Bhartiya Janata Party by a margin of 11,731 votes in the 2015 Delhi Legislative Assembly elections. In 1993, for the first First Legislative Assembly of Delhi he contested the elections as a BJP candidate and was elected.

Posts held

Electoral performance

See also

First Legislative Assembly of Delhi
Sixth Legislative Assembly of Delhi
Seventh Legislative Assembly of Delhi
Delhi Legislative Assembly
Government of India
Politics of India
Aam Aadmi Party

References

References 

Living people
People from New Delhi
Speakers of the Delhi Legislative Assembly
Delhi MLAs 2015–2020
Delhi MLAs 2020–2025
1948 births
Bharatiya Janata Party politicians from Delhi
Indian politicians convicted of crimes
Aam Aadmi Party MLAs from Delhi